Comet 252P/LINEAR is a periodic comet and near-Earth object discovered by the LINEAR survey on April 7, 2000. The comet is an Earth-Jupiter family comet, meaning that it passes quite close to both Earth and Jupiter. This causes its orbit to be perturbed frequently on an astronomical timescale.

The nominal orbit of 252P/LINEAR [2001] (K102/1) was thrown into the near-Earth region by Jupiter in February 1785, before which it had a perihelion near that of Mars (1774–1785). Prior to this, it had a perihelion in the asteroid belt (1607–1690) and even further before was most likely a Jupiter Trojan. Since its Jupiter MOID is currently 0.2 AU, Jupiter remains the primary factor in its orbital disruption.

At some point before 1860, 252P/LINEAR separated from a secondary, smaller fragment discovered in January 2016, designated P/2016 BA14 (PANSTARRS). The nucleus of the secondary is 60–200 meters wide, half that of the primary. 252P/LINEAR will get as close as 0.0356 AU (13.9 LD) to Earth on 21 March 2016 and P/2016 BA14 (PANSTARRS) will get as close as 0.0237 AU (9.2 LD) to Earth on 22 March 2016.

Associated meteor shower 
252P/LINEAR is predicted to perhaps make a weak new meteor shower during its 2016 approach. Peter Jenniskens and Jeremie
Vaubaillon calculated that possible meteors from this comet would radiate from the constellation of Lepus, south of Orion, from a radiant at R.A. = 77.0 deg, Decl. = -16.3 deg., with a slow geocentric velocity of Vg = 11.1 km/s on March 28 and 29, when Earth reaches the comet orbit. Rates will be low. There are no encounters with the dust trails created since A.D. 1850, but instead a diffuse cloud of perturbed meteoroids ejected during 1894-1926 is calculated to be in Earth's path (see CBET telegram 4267).

Quan-Zhi Ye calculated that possible meteors from comet P/2016 BA14 (PANSTARRS) would radiate from the constellation Columba, south of Lepus during the late UT hours of March 20. The radiant is at R.A. = 82 deg, Decl. = -39 deg, with geocentric velocity Vg = 14.1 km/s. Meteoroids ejected since A.D. 1750 were studied, with also no dust trail encounters found in 2016 (see CBET telegram 4259).

A meteor shower has been observed with a similar orbit to 252P/LINEAR, previously known as the March Lyncids, in the constellation Lynx. It is not known for certain if the shower is related to the comet.

Fragment 

P/2016 BA14 was radar imaged at distance of 2.2 million miles (9 lunar distances) during a flyby of Earth in 2016. This enabled the size of the nucleus to be calculated to be about 3000 to 3300 feet (1 km) in diameter, which was bigger than expected.

 had unique history in that when it was discovered in January 2016 by a PanSTARRS telescope, it was thought to be an asteroid and went by a provisional minor planet designation . An astronomer then realized the body's orbit was very similar to 252P/LINEAR, which lead to a follow up observation by the Lowell Discovery Telescope. The body showed a tail, identifying it as a probable comet and then named P/.

Gallery

See also 
 55P/Tempel–Tuttle (Close approach to Earth 1366)
 Comet IRAS–Araki–Alcock (Close approach to earth in 1983)

References

External links 
 Orbital simulation from JPL (Java) / Horizons Ephemeris
 252P/LINEAR – Seiichi Yoshida @ aerith.net

Periodic comets
252P
0252

20160322
Comets in 2016
20000407